Assholes: A Theory is a Canadian documentary film, directed by John Walker and released in 2019. Based on Aaron James's 2012 non-fiction book Assholes: A Theory, the film explores the prevalence of self-centred asshole behaviour in contemporary society. A variety of figures appear in the film, most notably actor John Cleese.

The film premiered in March 2019 at the Copenhagen International Documentary Film Festival, before having its Canadian premiere in April at the Hot Docs Canadian International Documentary Festival. It received a limited commercial run in November 2019, before having its television premiere on the Canadian Broadcasting Corporation's Documentary Channel in 2020.

The film received a nomination for the Donald Brittain Award at the 9th Canadian Screen Awards in 2021. It was also a nominee for Best Editing in a Documentary Program or Series (Jeff Warren), and Best Writing in a Documentary Program or Series (Walker, Robert Sandler).

References

External links

Assholes: A Theory at Library and Archives Canada

2019 films
2019 documentary films
Canadian documentary films
Films based on non-fiction books
Films directed by John Walker
2010s English-language films
2010s Canadian films